The Tempting of America is a 1990 non-fiction book by former United States Court of Appeals judge Robert Bork. Published three years after the U. S. Senate rejected Bork's nomination to the United States Supreme Court, the book offers a personal account of the nomination battle, argues for an originalist approach to constitutional interpretation, and warns against what Bork sees as the politicization of American law. The book spent sixteen weeks on The New York Times non-fiction bestseller list.

See also
United States Supreme Court

References

External links
C-SPAN interview with Bork about the book
Book page at Simon & Schuster

1990 non-fiction books